West Edmeston is a hamlet on the Unadilla River on the border of the Town of Brookfield in Madison County and the Town of Edmeston in Otsego County, New York, United States. On August 24, 1898, the new First Day Baptist Church building was opened in West Edmeston.  Conceived in January 1897, the church was formally organized in February 1898 and admitted to the Otsego County Baptist Association.

External links
Upper Unadilla Valley Association

Hamlets in New York (state)
Syracuse metropolitan area
Hamlets in Otsego County, New York
Hamlets in Madison County, New York